Europe Elects is a poll aggregator that collects and publishes election-related data such as opinion polls in European countries.

Genesis and history 
Europe Elects was founded in 2014 as a Twitter account. The project quickly rose to prominence, as it was the first account that gathered European polling and election data in one spot.

Format 
Europe Elects provides election results during election days on social media, referring to the European Parliament affiliation of candidates and parties.

The organization publishes polls done by polling companies in all European countries and its subdivisions in order to show both the level of support for national parties as well as for the European Union in each country. Europe Elects's visualization of the data is unique, as it uses standardized labels and colours for national parties of one European Parliament group across national borders. The publications regularly point out the affiliation of national parties with their respective European Parliament groups, which has been adopted by other media outlets over time. Furthermore, overviews of the positions of the single parties and candidates are being provided. Europe Elects publishes on the basis of the collected data a European projection for the European Parliament on a regular basis and shows how the results as if there were elections on that day. After the 2019 European Parliament election, Europe Elects claimed to have had the most precise forecast for the European Parliament.

In 2019, the platform launched the Europe Elects Podcast. In 2019 and 2020, America Elects, Oceania Elects, Africa Elects, and Asia Elects were launched. Asia Elects received attention in the context of the Hong Kong local elections, being quoted in media such as The Washington Post.

The platform hosts an extensive calendar of local, regional, national, and European election dates in Europe.

Spread and perception 
Europe Elects is considered a major media source concerning the European Parliament and electoral analysis in Europe. It is quoted frequently in both European and worldwide publications, is referenced by the Centre for European Policy Studies, and is listed in the database of the European Data Journalism Network, a consortium of media and journalists promoting data-driven multilingual coverage of European topics.

In 2021, Europe Elects formed a partnership with Euractiv and Decision Desk HQ.

Awards 
In 2022, Europe Elects was awarded the Dalhousie Impact Award.

See also 
 EUobserver
 FiveThirtyEight
Voxeurop

References

External links 
 

Elections in Europe
Non-profit organisations based in Rhineland-Palatinate
Non-profit organisations based in Austria
Organisations based in Vienna
Organizations established in 2014
Pan-Europeanism
Pan-European media companies
Public opinion research companies